Yahya al-Mu`tasim (Abū Zakarīyā' Al-Mu`taṣim Yaḥyā ibn An-Nāṣir; died 1236) was an Almohad rival caliph who reigned from 1227 to 1229. He was a son of Muhammad al-Nasir and brother of Yusuf II, Almohad caliph.

Life 
At the death of his uncle Abdallah al-Adil, Yahya was supported by the sheikhs of Marrakesh, but two years later he was turned down by another pretender, his other uncle Idris al-Ma'mun. At the latter's death in 1232, Yahya renewed his pretenses, but his cousin Abd al-Wahid II was preferred to him. He was anyway able to keep Marrakesh until his death in 1236, after which the Almohad territories were again united under Abd al-Wahid.

Sources
Charles-André Julien. Histoire de l‘Afrique du Nord, des origines à 1830.

Notes

1236 deaths
13th-century Almohad caliphs
People from Marrakesh
13th-century Berber people
Year of birth unknown